St. Stephen's Episcopal Church is a historic church located at 196 Brick Church Circle in St. Stephen, South Carolina. Built in the 1760s, it is one of a handful of surviving 18th-century brick parish churches in the state, with a number of architectural features not found on any other of the period.  It was declared a National Historic Landmark in 1970.

Description and history
St. Stephen's Church is located on the east side of St. Stephen, on the south side of Church Road (South Carolina Highway 45). It is set on a parcel of about  that includes the churchyard and cemetery, and is surrounded on three sides by Brick Church Circle. It is topped by a gambrel roof with curvilinear roof sections and Jacobean gable ends. There are three entrances, two on the long sides and one on the short western side. The doors and windows are set in round-arch openings with fanlight windows above, and the bays on each side are articulated by Doric brick pilasters. The interior is divided roughly into four sections by two crossing aisles, with the pulpit located at the eastern end, in front of a small Palladian window. The ceiling is of ornamented metal. The building's walls are stabilized by iron rods (placed after an 1886 earthquake), that run down and across the interior of the structure. it is built in Georgian style.
| added                = April 15, 1970

The St. Stephen's parish was set off from the parish of St. James, Santee in 1754.  This church was built between 1767 and 1769, replacing an earlier wood frame structure.  It is one of South Carolina's well-preserved small brick country parish churches, its unique features including the gambrel roof and pilastered exterior, and the interior ceiling. It was built and designed by Francis Villepontoux and A. Howard who provided the bricks. William Axson was the master mason. There were no regular services in the church between 1808 and 1932, but the building was not neglected. Needed repairs were done twice during the 19th century.

Current use
St. Stephen's is still an active church in the Episcopal Diocese of South Carolina. The Rev. Jeffrey Richardson is the current rector.

See also

National Register of Historic Places listings in Berkeley County, South Carolina
List of National Historic Landmarks in South Carolina
St. Stephen's Episcopal Church (disambiguation)

References

External links

St. Stephen's Episcopal Church, Berkeley County (S.C. Hwy. 45, St. Stephens), at South Carolina Department of Archives and History
 National Historic Landmarks Program listing for St. Stephen's Episcopal Church

National Historic Landmarks in South Carolina
Churches on the National Register of Historic Places in South Carolina
Episcopal churches in South Carolina
Churches in Berkeley County, South Carolina
Churches completed in 1767
18th-century Episcopal church buildings
Historic American Buildings Survey in South Carolina
National Register of Historic Places in Berkeley County, South Carolina
1754 establishments in South Carolina
Religious organizations established in 1754
Georgian architecture in South Carolina